Mohamed Walid Bencherifa (born 6 November 1988 in Algiers) is an  Algerian professional football player who plays for Olympique Club de Khouribga in Botola .

Club career
Bencherifa began his career with OMR El Annasser and RC Kouba, who he played for in the Algerian Ligue Professionnelle 2. He scored 7 goals for RC Kouba in the 2011–12 Algerian Ligue Professionnelle 2.

On 21 May 2012 Bencherifa signed a two-year contract with JS Kabylie.

References

External links
NFT Profile

1988 births
Algerian Ligue 2 players
Algerian footballers
Algeria international footballers
JS Kabylie players
Footballers from Algiers
Living people
RC Kouba players
OMR El Annasser players
CS Constantine players
Algerian Ligue Professionnelle 1 players
Association football midfielders
21st-century Algerian people